Title 21 of the United States Code governs Food and Drugs in the United States Code (U.S.C.).

Title 21 — Food and Drugs
Title 21 has 26 chapters:
 — Adulterated or Misbranded Foods or Drugs (§§ 1—26)
 — Teas (repealed) (§§ 41–50)
 — Filled Milk (§§ 61–64)
Filled Milk Act
 — Animals, Meats, and Meat and Dairy Products (§§ 71–149)
 — Viruses, Serums, Toxins, Antitoxins, and Analogous Products (§§ 151–159)
 — [Bureau of Narcotics] (omitted) (§§ 161–165)
former Federal Bureau of Narcotics
 — [Narcotic Drugs] (repealed or transferred)
 — Practice of Pharmacy and Sale of Poisons in Consular Districts in China
 — Narcotic Farms (repealed)
 — Federal Food, Drug, and Cosmetic Act
 — Poultry and Poultry Products Inspection
Poultry Products Inspection Act of 1957
 — Manufacture of Narcotic Drugs (repealed)
 — Meat Inspection
Meat Inspection Act of 1906
 — Drug Abuse Prevention and Control
Controlled Substances Act, a part of the Comprehensive Drug Abuse Prevention and Control Act of 1970.
 — [Alcohol and Drug Abuse Educational Programs and Activities] (repealed)
 — Egg Products Inspection
 — Drug Abuse Prevention, Treatment, and Rehabilitation
 — [National Drug Enforcement Policy] (repealed)
 — Presidents Media Commission on Alcohol and Drug Abuse Prevention
 — Pesticide Monitoring Improvements
 — National Drug Control Program
 — Biomaterials Access Assurance
 — National Drug Control Policy
Office of National Drug Control Policy
 — [National Youth Anti-Drug Media Campaign] (repealed)
 — International Narcotics Trafficking
 — Miscellaneous Anti-Drug Abuse Provisions

See also
Title 21 of the Code of Federal Regulations - Food and Drugs

References

External links
U.S.C Title 21, via Cornell Law School Legal Information Institute (as above)
U.S.C. Title 21, via United States Government Printing Office

21
Title 21